The 2005 Penn Quakers football team represented the University of Pennsylvania in the 2005 NCAA Division I-AA football season. It was the 129th season of play for the Quakers. They were led by 14th-year head coach Al Bagnoli and played their home games at Franklin Field in Philadelphia. They finished sixth in the Ivy League, with an overall record of 5–5 overall and a league record of 3–4.

Schedule

References

Penn
Penn Quakers football seasons
Penn Quakers football